Rutherfordton (usually pronounced or , among other similar variations) is a town in Rutherford County, North Carolina, United States. The population was 4,213 at the 2010 census. It is the county seat.

Geography
Rutherfordton is concentrated around the intersection of U.S. Route 221 and North Carolina Highway 108.  The town of Ruth borders Rutherfordton to the north, and the town of Spindale borders Rutherfordton to the east.

According to the United States Census Bureau, the town has a total area of 4.2 square miles (10.8 km), all  land.

Demographics

2020 census

As of the 2020 United States census, there were 3,640 people, 1,882 households, and 893 families residing in the town.

2000 census
As of the census of 2000, there were 4,131 people, 1,602 households, and 1,047 families residing in the town. The population density was 990.1 people per square mile (382.5/km). There were 1,765 housing units at an average density of 423.0 per square mile (163.4/km). The racial makeup of the town was 84.17% White, 13.60% African American, 0.12% Native American, 0.73% Asian, 0.73% from other races, and 0.65% from two or more races. Hispanic or Latino of any race were 1.28% of the population.

There were 1,602 households, out of which 30.0% had children under the age of 18 living with them, 48.9% were married couples living together, 13.2% had a female householder with no husband present, and 34.6% were non-families. 31.5% of all households were made up of individuals, and 16.1% had someone living alone who was 65 years of age or older. The average household size was 2.33 and the average family size was 2.91.

In the town, the population was spread out, with 22.6% under the age of 18, 6.9% from 18 to 24, 28.0% from 25 to 44, 22.0% from 45 to 64, and 20.5% who were 65 years of age or older. The median age was 40 years. For every 100 females, there were 89.4 males. For every 100 females age 18 and over, there were 85.5 males.

The median income for a household in the town was $37,941, and the median income for a family was $47,381. Males had a median income of $34,592 versus $23,371 for females. The per capita income for the town was $21,742. About 8.8% of families and 10.8% of the population were below the poverty line, including 15.4% of those under age 18 and 12.6% of those age 65 or over.

Arts and culture
Sites listed on the National Register of Historic Places including: the Bechtler Mint Site, Carrier Houses, Fox Haven Plantation, Gilbert Town Historic District, George W. Logan House, Main Street Historic District, Rutherford County Courthouse, Rutherfordton-Spindale Central High School, St. Luke's Chapel, and Trinity Lutheran Church.

Notable people
 Betsy Brantley, actress
 William T. Carpenter, psychiatrist who served as an expert witness in the trial of John W. Hinckley
 Walter H. Dalton, former Lieutenant Governor of North Carolina
 Bruce Davis, former National Football League offensive tackle
 Gomer Hodge, former Major League Baseball player, coach, and manager
 Sherry Hursey, actress
 Tom Wright, former Major League Baseball outfielder

References

External links

Official website

County seats in North Carolina
 
Towns in North Carolina
Towns in Rutherford County, North Carolina